Stefan Bajohr (4 October 1950 – 21 November 2022) was a German university lecturer, social scientist, and politician. A member of Alliance 90/The Greens, he served in the Landtag of North Rhine-Westphalia from 1995 to 2000.

Bajohr died on 21 November 2022 at the age of 72.

References

1950 births
2022 deaths
20th-century German politicians
Alliance 90/The Greens politicians
Members of the Landtag of North Rhine-Westphalia
People from Goslar (district)
Bielefeld University alumni
University of Zurich alumni
University of Marburg alumni
Academic staff of the University of Marburg
Academic staff of Heinrich Heine University Düsseldorf